Esence is the name of several places in Turkey:

Esence, Adıyaman
Esence, Afşin
Esence, Alpu
Esence, Beşiri
Esence, Beyşehir
Esence, Kemaliye
Esence, Kumru
Esence, Mudanya
Esence, Niksar
Esence, Şenkaya

See also
Esençay (disambiguation)
Essence (disambiguation)